William Knox may refer to:

Australia 

 William Dunn Knox (1880–1945), Australian artist
 William Knox (Victorian politician) (1850–1913), Australian politician - House
William Knox (Queensland politician) (1927–2001), Australian state politician - Legislative Assembly

United Kingdom 

 William Knox (Scottish poet) (1789–1825), Scottish poet and journalist
 William Knox D'Arcy (1849–1917), British entrepreneur
 William Knox (footballer), Scottish professional footballer
William Knox (footballer, born 1904), Scottish professional footballer
William Knox (MP) (1826–1900), MP for Dungannon
William Knox (British Army officer) (1847–1916), British general
William Knox (bishop) (1762–1831), Bishop of Killaloe and Kilfenora
William Knox (artist) (1862–1935), British artist of marine paintings and scenes of Venice
William Knox (cricketer) (1903–1954), Scottish cricketer
Bill Knox (1928–1999), Scottish author
Willie Knox (born 1937), Scottish professional footballer and manager

United States 
Frank Knox (William Franklin Knox, 1874–1944),  American Secretary of the Navy
William F. Knox (1885–1975), American football player and coach and lawyer
William Jacob Knox Jr., African-American chemist, worked on the Manhattan Project
 William J. Knox (1820–1867), California businessman and politician
William Shadrach Knox (1843–1914), American congressman from Massachusetts
William W. Knox (1911–1981), U.S. federal judge